John S. Spence (1788–1840) was a  U.S. Senator from Maryland from 1836 to 1840. Senator Spence may also refer to:

Brent Spence (1874–1967), Kentucky State Senate
Floyd Spence (1928–2001), South Carolina State Senate
Nancy Spence (born 1936), Colorado State Senate

See also
Senator Spencer (disambiguation)